A Patch of Blue is a 1965 American drama film directed by Guy Green about the friendship between an educated black man (played by Sidney Poitier) and an illiterate, blind, white 18-year-old girl (played by Elizabeth Hartman in her film debut), and the problems that plague their friendship in a racially divided America. Made in 1965 against the backdrop of the growing civil rights movement, the film explores racism while playing on the idea that "love is blind."

Shelley Winters won the Academy Award for Best Supporting Actress, her second win for the award, following her victory in 1959 for The Diary of Anne Frank. It was the final screen appearance for veteran actor Wallace Ford.

Scenes of Poitier and Hartman kissing were cut from the film when it was shown in film theaters in the Southern United States. These scenes are intact in the DVD version. According to the DVD audio commentary, it was the decision of director Guy Green that A Patch of Blue be filmed in black and white although color was available.

The film was adapted by Guy Green from the 1961 book Be Ready with Bells and Drums by the Australian author Elizabeth Kata. The book later won a Writers Guild of America award. The book's plot has a slightly less optimistic ending than the film.

In addition to the Best Supporting Actress win for Winters, the film was nominated for Academy Awards for Best Actress in a Leading Role (Elizabeth Hartman), Best Art Direction-Set Decoration (Black-and-White) (George Davis, Urie McCleary, Henry Grace, Charles S. Thompson), Best Cinematography (Black-and-White) and Best Music (Original Music Score). Hartman, 22 at the time, was the youngest Best Actress nominee, a record she held for 10 years before 20-year-old Isabelle Adjani broke her record in 1975.

Plot 
Selina D'Arcey is a blind white girl living in a city apartment with her crude and vulgar mother Rose-Ann, who works as a prostitute, and her grandfather Ole Pa. She strings beads to supplement her family's small income and spends most of her time doing chores. Her mother is abusive, and Ole Pa is an alcoholic. Selina has no friends, rarely leaves the apartment, and has never received an education.

Selina convinces her grandfather to take her to the park, where she happens to meet Gordon Ralfe, an educated and soft-spoken black man working night shifts in an office. The two quickly become friends, meeting at the park almost every day. Gordon learns that she was blinded at the age of five when Rose-Ann threw chemicals on her while attempting to hit her husband and that she was raped by one of Rose-Ann's "boyfriends."

Rose-Ann's friend Sadie is also a prostitute, and while lamenting the loss of her youth, she realizes that Selina can be useful in their business. Subsequently, Rose-Ann and Sadie decide to leave Ole Pa, move with Selina into a better apartment, and force her into prostitution.

In the meantime, Gordon has contacted a school for the blind, which is ready to take Selina. While Rose-Ann is out, Selina runs away to the park; and, with some difficulty, meets Gordon. She tells Gordon about Rose-Ann's plan, and he assures her that she will be leaving for school in a few days. Finding Selina missing from the apartment, Rose-Ann takes Ole Pa to the park and confronts Gordon. Despite Rose-Ann's resistance, Gordon manages to take Selina away when the crowd of white people looks at Rose-Ann's anger and hysterics towards Gordon with disdain and ignores her pleas to stop the Black man from walking away with her daughter. Ole Pa then stops Rose-Ann from chasing after them, telling her that Selina is not a child anymore.

At Gordon's house, Selina asks Gordon to marry her, to which Gordon replies that there are many types of love, and she later will realize that their relationship will not work. Selina tells him that she loves him, knows that he is Black, and his skin color doesn't matter to her. Gordon tells her she must meet more people and wait a year to find out whether their love is more than friendship. Then, a bus arrives to pick up Selina for her trip to the school; and both friends say goodbye. Gordon had given Selina a music box that belonged to his grandmother.  When she leaves it behind in the apartment, he runs after her to give it back, but just misses the bus and walks back upstairs to his apartment building.

Cast

Reception

Critical reception
A Patch of Blue has a 89% approval rating on Rotten Tomatoes, based on nine reviews.

Box-office
The film proved to be the most successful in Poitier's career, which proved a lucrative development considering he agreed to a salary cut in exchange for 10% of the film's gross earnings. In addition, the film made Poitier a major national film star with excellent business in even southern cities like Houston, Atlanta and Charlotte.

Awards and nominations

The film is recognized by American Film Institute in these lists:
 2002: AFI's 100 Years...100 Passions – Nominated
 2005: AFI's 100 Years of Film Scores – Nominated

Soundtrack
The soundtrack to A Patch of Blue was composed and conducted by Jerry Goldsmith.  It gained Goldsmith his second Academy Award nomination for Best Original Score following his score to Freud in 1962. It was one of the 250 nominated scores for the American Film Institute's top 25 American film scores. The score has been released three times on CD; in 1991 through Mainstream Records (with the score to David and Lisa by Mark Lawrence), in 1992 through Tsunami Records (with his score to Patton), and an extended version in 1997 through Intrada Records.

A Cinderella Named Elizabeth
The film's creators also made a short film about Hartman's selection to play the starring role. The short, titled A Cinderella Named Elizabeth, focuses on her status as an unknown actress from Youngstown, Ohio, and includes segments from her screen test and associated "personality test", in which the actress is filmed while being herself and answering questions about everyday topics such as her taste in clothing. The short also shows her visiting the Braille Institute of America to watch blind people being trained to do handwork — similar to the beadwork her character does in the film — and to perform tasks of daily living and self-care, of the sort that Poitier's character teaches Selina to do.

See also
Civil rights movement in popular culture
List of American films of 1965

References

External links
 
 
 
 
 

1965 films
1965 drama films
American coming-of-age drama films
1960s coming-of-age drama films
American black-and-white films
1960s English-language films
Films scored by Jerry Goldsmith
Films about blind people
Films about dysfunctional families
Films about interracial romance
Films about prostitution in the United States
Films about race and ethnicity
Films based on Australian novels
Films directed by Guy Green
Films featuring a Best Supporting Actress Academy Award-winning performance
Films shot in Los Angeles
Metro-Goldwyn-Mayer films
1960s American films
Films about disability